In linguistics, a blend (sometimes called blend word, lexical blend, portmanteau, or portmanteau word) is a word formed from parts of two or more other words. At least one of these parts is not a morph (the realization of a morpheme) but instead a mere splinter, a fragment that is normally meaningless. In the words of Valerie Adams:

In words such as motel, boatel and Lorry-Tel, hotel is represented by various shorter substitutes – otel, tel, or el – which I shall call splinters. Words containing splinters I shall call blends.Adams attributes the term splinter to J. M. Berman, "Contribution on blending," Zeitschrift für Anglistik und Amerikanistik 9 (1961), pp. 278–281.

Classification
Blends of two or more words may be classified from each of three viewpoints: morphotactic, morphonological, and morphosemantic.

Morphotactic classification
Blends may be classified morphotactically into two kinds: total and partial.

Total blends
In a total blend, each of the words creating the blend is reduced to a mere splinter. Some linguists limit blends to these (perhaps with additional conditions): for example, Ingo Plag considers "proper blends" to be total blends that semantically are coordinate, the remainder being "shortened compounds".

Commonly for English blends, the beginning of one word is followed by the end of another:
boom + hoist → boost 
breakfast + lunch → brunch 

Much less commonly in English, the beginning of one word may be followed by the beginning of another:
teleprinter + exchange → telex 
American + Indian → Amerind 
Some linguists do not regard beginning+beginning concatenations as blends, instead calling them complex clippings, clipping compounds or clipped compounds.

Unusually in English, the end of one word may be followed by the end of another:
Red Bull + margarita → bullgarita 
Hello Kitty + delicious → kittylicious 

A splinter of one word may replace part of another, as in three coined by Lewis Carroll in "Jabberwocky":
chuckle + snort → chortle 
flimsy + miserable → mimsy
slimy + lithe → slithy 
They are sometimes termed intercalative blends; these words are among the original "portmanteaus" for which this meaning of the word was created.

Partial blends
In a partial blend, one entire word is concatenated with a splinter from another. Some linguists do not recognize these as blends.

An entire word may be followed by a splinter:
dumb + confound → dumbfound 
fan + magazine → fanzine 

A splinter may be followed by an entire word:
Brad + Angelina → Brangelina 
American + Indian → Amerindian 

An entire word may replace part of another:
adorable + dork → adorkable 
disgusting + gross → disgrossting 
These have also been called sandwich words, and classed among intercalative blends.

(When two words are combined in their entirety, the result is considered a compound word rather than a blend. For example, bagpipe is a compound, not a blend, of bag and pipe.)

Morphonological classification
Morphonologically, blends fall into two kinds: overlapping and non-overlapping.

Overlapping blends
Overlapping blends are those for which the ingredients' consonants, vowels or even syllables overlap to some extent. The overlap can be of different kinds. These are also called haplologic blends.

There may be an overlap that is both phonological and orthographic, but with no other shortening:
anecdote + dotage → anecdotage 
pal + alimony → palimony 

The overlap may be both phonological and orthographic, and with some additional shortening to at least one of the ingredients:
California + fornication → Californication 
picture + dictionary → pictionary 

Such an overlap may be discontinuous:
politician + pollution → pollutician 
beef + buffalo → beefalo 
These are also termed imperfect blends.

It can occur with three components:
camisade + cannibalism  + ballistics → camibalistics 
meander + Neanderthal + tale → meandertale 

The phonological overlap need not also be orthographic:
back + acronym → backronym 
war + orgasm → wargasm 

If the phonological but non-orthographic overlap encompasses the whole of the shorter ingredient, as in
sin + cinema → sinema 
sham + champagne → shampagne 
then the effect depends on orthography alone. (They are also called orthographic blends.)

An orthographic overlap need not also be phonological:
smoke + fog → smog 
binary + unit → bit 

For some linguists, an overlap is a condition for a blend.

Non-overlapping blends
Non-overlapping blends (also called substitution blends) have no overlap, whether phonological or orthographic:
California + Mexico → Calexico 
beautiful + delicious → beaulicious

Morphosemantic classification
Morphosemantically, blends fall into two kinds: attributive and coordinate.

Attributive blends
Attributive blends (also called syntactic or telescope blends) are those in which one of the ingredients is the head and the other is attributive. A porta-light is a portable light, not a 'light-emitting' or light portability; light is the head. A snobject is a snobbery-satisfying object and not an objective or other kind of snob; object is the head.

As is also true for (conventional, non-blend) attributive compounds (among which bathroom, for example, is a kind of room, not a kind of bath), the attributive blends of English are mostly head-final and mostly endocentric. As an example of an exocentric attributive blend, Fruitopia may metaphorically take the buyer to a fruity utopia (and not a utopian fruit); however, it is not a utopia but a drink.

Coordinate blends
Coordinate blends (also called associative or portmanteau blends) combine two words having equal status, and have two heads. Thus brunch is neither a breakfasty lunch nor a lunchtime breakfast but instead some hybrid of breakfast and lunch; Oxbridge is equally Oxford and Cambridge universities. This too parallels (conventional, non-blend) compounds: an actor–director is equally an actor and a director.

Two kinds of coordinate blends are particularly conspicuous: those that combine (near) synonyms:
gigantic + enormous → ginormous
insinuation + innuendo → insinuendo
and those that combine (near) opposites:
transmitter + receiver → transceiver
friend + enemy → frenemy

Blending of two roots
Blending can also apply to roots rather than words, for instance in Israeli Hebrew:
 רמזור ramzor 'traffic light' combines רמז √rmz 'hint' and אור or 'light'.
 מגדלור migdalor 'lighthouse' combines מגדל migdal 'tower' and אור or 'light'.
 Israeli דחפור dakhpór 'bulldozer' hybridizes (Mishnaic Hebrew>) Israeli דחפ √dħp 'push' and (Biblical Hebrew>) Israeli חפר √ħpr 'dig'[...]
 Israeli שלטוט shiltút 'zapping, surfing the channels, flipping through the channels' derives from
 (i) (Hebrew>) Israeli שלט shalát 'remote control', an ellipsis – like English remote (but using the noun instead) – of the (widely known) compound שלט רחוק shalát rakhók – cf. the Academy of the Hebrew Language's שלט רחק shalát rákhak; and
 (ii) (Hebrew>) Israeli שטוט shitút 'wandering, vagrancy'. Israeli שלטוט shiltút was introduced by the Academy of the Hebrew Language in [...] 1996. Synchronically, it might appear to result from reduplication of the final consonant of shalát 'remote control'.
 Another example of blending which has also been explained as mere reduplication is Israeli גחלילית gakhlilít 'fire-fly, glow-fly, Lampyris'. This coinage by Hayyim Nahman Bialik blends (Hebrew>) Israeli גחלת gakhélet 'burning coal' with (Hebrew>) Israeli לילה láyla 'night'. Compare this with the unblended חכלילית khakhlilít '(black) redstart, Phœnicurus''' (<Biblical Hebrew חכליל 'dull red, reddish'). Synchronically speaking though, most native Israeli-speakers feel that gakhlilít includes a reduplication of the third radical of גחל √għl. This is incidentally how Ernest Klein explains gakhlilít. Since he is attempting to provide etymology, his description might be misleading if one agrees that Hayyim Nahman Bialik had blending in mind."

"There are two possible etymological analyses for Israeli Hebrew כספר kaspár 'bank clerk, teller'. The first is that it consists of (Hebrew>) Israeli כסף késef 'money' and the (International/Hebrew>) Israeli agentive suffix ר- -ár. The second is that it is a quasi-portmanteau word which blends כסף késef 'money' and (Hebrew>) Israeli ספר √spr 'count'. Israeli Hebrew כספר kaspár started as a brand name but soon entered the common language. Even if the second analysis is the correct one, the final syllable ר- -ár apparently facilitated nativization since it was regarded as the Hebrew suffix ר- -år (probably of Persian pedigree), which usually refers to craftsmen and professionals, for instance as in Mendele Mocher Sforim's coinage סמרטוטר smartutár 'rag-dealer'."

Lexical selection
Blending may occur with an error in lexical selection, the process by which a speaker uses his semantic knowledge to choose words. Lewis Carroll's explanation, which gave rise to the use of 'portmanteau' for such combinations, was:

Humpty Dumpty's theory, of two meanings packed into one word like a portmanteau, seems to me the right explanation for all. For instance, take the two words "fuming" and "furious." Make up your mind that you will say both words ... you will say "frumious."

The errors are based on similarity of meanings, rather than phonological similarities, and the morphemes or phonemes stay in the same position within the syllable.

Use

Some languages, like Japanese, encourage the shortening and merging of borrowed foreign words (as in gairaigo), because they are long or difficult to pronounce in the target language. For example, karaoke, a combination of the Japanese word kara (meaning empty) and the clipped form oke of the English loanword "orchestra" (J. ōkesutora オーケストラ), is a Japanese blend that has entered the English language. The Vietnamese language also encourages blend words formed from Sino-Vietnamese vocabulary. For example, the term Việt Cộng is derived from the first syllables of "Việt Nam" (Vietnam) and "Cộng sản" (communist).

Many corporate brand names, trademarks, and initiatives, as well as names of corporations and organizations themselves, are blends. For example, Wiktionary, one of Wikipedia's sister projects, is a blend of wiki and dictionary''.

See also 
 Acronym and initialism
 Amalgamation (names)
 Clipping (morphology)
 Conceptual blending
 Hybrid word
 List of blend words
 Phonestheme
 Phono-semantic matching
 Syllabic abbreviation
 Wiktionary category:English blends

Notes

References

External links

Word coinage